The Bayer designation δ Gruis (Delta Gruis) is shared by two stars in the constellation Grus:

 δ1 Gruis
 δ2 Gruis

Grus (constellation)
Gruis, Delta